William Herbert Foege (-ghee; born March 12, 1936) is an American physician and epidemiologist who is credited with "devising the global strategy that led to the eradication of smallpox in the late 1970s". From May 1977 to 1983, Foege served as the Director of the Centers for Disease Control and Prevention.

Foege also "played a central role" in efforts that greatly increased immunization rates in developing countries in the 1980s.

In June 2011, he authored House on Fire: The Fight to Eradicate Smallpox, a book on modern science, medicine, and public health over the smallpox disease.

On September 23, 2020, he sent a private letter to Centers for Disease Control and Prevention Director Robert R. Redfield urging him to acknowledge in writing that the CDC had responded poorly to COVID-19 and to set a new course for how CDC would lead the United States' response, calling the White House's approach "disastrous."

Early life 
Foege was born March 12 1936 in Decorah, Iowa. He was the third of six children born to William A. Foege, a Lutheran minister, and Anne Erika Foege. The family lived in Eldorado, Iowa in Fayette County, starting in 1936 and moved to Chewelah, Washington, in 1945.

In his younger days he was inspired by the life of his uncle, a Lutheran missionary to New Guinea. He became interested in science at age 13 when working at a pharmacy, and read extensively about the world (e.g., Albert Schweitzer's work in Africa) while in a body cast for several months at age 15. When a teenager he expressed a desire to practice medicine in Africa.

Education 
Foege received a B.A. from Pacific Lutheran University in 1957. He attended medical school at the University of Washington, where he became interested in public health while working "after school and on Saturdays" at the Seattle–King County Health Department.  After receiving his M.D. in 1961, he completed an internship with the United States Public Health Service hospital at Staten Island in 1961–1962.

He participated in the Epidemic Intelligence Service (EIS) of the Centers for Disease Control and Prevention (CDC) between 1962 and 1964, assigned to Colorado. When Foege was with the EIS, he was inspired by Alexander Langmuir to pursue global health, and spent a short time with the Peace Corps in India under Charles Snead Houston. Upon reading a lecture on priorities in public health by Thomas Huckle Weller, Foege entered the Master of Public Health program at the Harvard School of Public Health where he studied with Weller. He received his M.P.H. in 1965.

Smallpox eradication 
While working for the Centers for Disease Control in Africa as Chief of the Smallpox Eradication Program, Bill Foege developed the highly successful surveillance and ring vaccination strategy to contain smallpox spread. This greatly reduced the number of vaccinations needed, ensuring that the limited resources available sufficed to make smallpox the first infectious disease to be eradicated in human history.

For his efforts to eradicate smallpox, Foege was the co-winner of the 2020 Future of Life Award along with Viktor Zhdanov. "We're all indebted to Bill Foege and Viktor Zhdanov for their critical contributions to the eradication of smallpox, which demonstrated the immense value of science and international collaboration for fighting disease", said António Guterres, Secretary General, United Nations. Dr. William MacAskill who wrote an article about "Smallpox was one of the worst diseases to ever befall the human race, and its eradication is one of the greatest achievements of humanity. Bill Foege and Viktor Zhdanov should be celebrated for their contributions, and should inspire us today to take effective action to tackle the world's most pressing problems." In consideration of the achievements of Zhdanov and Foege, Bill Gates added, "They (Viktor and Bill) are phenomenal examples of what it means to harness science for global health”.

Career 
Foege's research includes child survival and development, injury prevention, population, preventive medicine, and public health leadership—particularly in the developing world. He is a strong proponent of disease eradication and control and has taken an active role in the eradication of Guinea Worm Disease, polio and measles, and the elimination of river blindness.

In May 1977, he became the director of the Centers for Disease Control and Prevention, and served until 1983.

Directorship aside, he has also held various positions during his career:

President, co-founder, The Task Force for Global Health, 1984-1999
Senior Fellow, Global Health Program, Bill & Melinda Gates Foundation
Advisory Board Member, Emory University Global Health Institute
Professor Emeritus, Rollins School of Public Health
Health Policy Fellow, The Carter Center, 1986–present
Executive Director, The Carter Center,  1986–1992
Advisory Medical Board Member, Theranos

Personal life 
Foege and his wife Paula had three sons, the eldest of whom died in 2007. He has been described as a "religious man"; between 1997 and 2006 he served on the Board of Regents of Pacific Lutheran University.

Awards and honors 
Abraham Lilienfeld Award, American College of Epidemiology, 1990
Fries Prize for Improving Health, James F. and Sarah T. Fries Foundation (formerly known as the Healthtrac Foundation), 1992
Sedgwick Memorial Medal, American Public Health Association, 1993
 Frank A. Calderone Prize, Columbia Mailman School of Public Health, 1996
Honorary Doctor of Science, Harvard University, 1997
Honorary Fellow, London School of Hygiene & Tropical Medicine, 1997–present
Honorary Doctor of Humane Letters, Pacific Lutheran University, 2000
Wittenberg Award, The Luther Institute, 2001
Mary Woodard Lasker Award for Public Service, 2001
C.-E. A. Winslow Medal, Yale University, 2004
Thomas Francis, Jr. Medal in Global Public Health, University of Michigan, 2005
Public Welfare Medal, United States National Academy of Sciences, 2005
Honorary Doctor of Medical Sciences, Yale University, 2005
Albert B. Sabin Gold Medal, Sabin Vaccine Institute, 2006
 Julius B. Richmond Award, Harvard School of Public Health, 2006
The William H. Foege building, named in his honor and dedicated in 2006, houses the University of Washington School of Medicine's Departments of Bioengineering and Genome Sciences.
Jimmy and Rosalynn Carter Award for Humanitarian Contributions to the Health of Humankind, National Foundation for Infectious Diseases, 2007
Chosen as one of "America's Best Leaders" by U.S. News & World Report, 2007
Raymond and Beverly Sackler Award for Sustained National Leadership, Research!America, 2008
CDC Foundation Hero Award, 2009
Ivan Allen Jr. Prize for Social Courage, Ivan Allen College of Liberal Arts at the Georgia Institute of Technology, 2012
Presidential Medal of Freedom, 2012
Richard and Barbara Hansen Leadership Award, University of Iowa College of Public Health, 2014
2020 Future of Life Award (Smallpox Eradication)

Selected publications

Books and book chapters 

Foege WH. "Foreword." In:

Journal articles

References

External links 
Bill Foege Oral History (interview by Victoria Harden, July 13, 2006; part of the Global Health Chronicles site).

1936 births
American epidemiologists
Smallpox eradication
Living people
University of Washington School of Medicine alumni
Pacific Lutheran University alumni
Harvard School of Public Health alumni
People from Decorah, Iowa
Vaccinologists
Theranos people
Presidential Medal of Freedom recipients
Directors of the Centers for Disease Control and Prevention
Carter administration personnel
Reagan administration personnel
Members of the National Academy of Medicine